The Royal Northern College of Music (RNCM) is a conservatoire located in Manchester, England. It is one of four conservatoires associated with the Associated Board of the Royal Schools of Music. In addition to being a centre of music education, RNCM is one of the UK's busiest and most diverse public performance venues.

History
The RNCM has a history dating back to the 19th century and the establishment of the Royal Manchester College of Music (RMCM). In 1858, Sir Charles Hallé founded the Hallé orchestra in Manchester, and by the early 1890s had raised the idea of a music college in the city. Following an appeal for support, a building on Ducie Street was secured, Hallé was appointed Principal and Queen Victoria conferred the Royal title. The RMCM opened its doors to 80 students in 1893, rising to 117 by the end of the first year. Less than four decades later, in 1920, the Northern School of Music was established (initially as a branch of the Matthay School of Music), and for many years the two institutions peacefully coexisted. It wasn't until 1955 that NSM Principal, Hilda Collens, in recognising the importance of performance in training students, met with RMCM Principal, Frederic Cox, to raise the question of merging. Discussions continued until September 1967 when a Joint Committee was formed to oversee plans to combine the two colleges. The RNCM was formed in 1972, moving to its purpose-built home on Oxford Road in 1973.

Building

The college building was built on the corner of Oxford Road and Booth Street East between 1968 and 1973 by architects Bickerdike, Allen, Rich. The two-storey rectangular concrete structure is fronted by tall glazed bays recessed behind an array of square concrete pillars. Originally an elevated walkway ran along the Oxford Road side connecting the building to the former neighbouring Precinct Centre via a bridge over Booth Street East. Truncated sections of this walkway were the vestigial evidence an unrealised plan to create a network of high-level  "boulevards", providing pedestrian routes on concrete stilts above street level from the RNCM to neighbouring buildings, and extending as far as Hulme and Ancoats. Only the bridges over Oxford Road and Booth Street East were ever constructed.

In 1997-8, the RNCM building was extended by architects Mills Beaumont Leavey Channon, with a new entrance built on the western side and the walkway removed.

A major refurbishment of the Concert Hall was undertaken between December 2013 and September 2014 by Scott Hughes Design.

Academics
The college offers both undergraduate (BMus and joint MusB/GRNCM course with the University of Manchester in any of the five specialisations offered) and postgraduate taught programmes (PGDip, MMus) in musical performance and composition. In association with Manchester Metropolitan University the college offers research degrees (MPhil, PhD) in musical performance, composition, musicology and music psychology as part of its Graduate School and also confers awards at Companion, Fellowship (FRNCM) and Member level.

In January 2005, the RNCM was awarded £4.5 million by the Higher Education Funding Council for England to become a recognised Centre for Excellence in Teaching and Learning (CETL), the only UK conservatoire to be selected.

The RNCM currently has 770 students and 320 teaching staff, the majority of whom are part-time visiting tutors. Many of the staff also teach at the Junior RNCM, a Saturday music school for talented young musicians who are keen on pursuing a musical career.

Faculties
The college is divided into 6 schools by area of specialisation.

School of Composition
School of Keyboard Studies
School of Strings
School of Vocal Studies and Opera
School of Wind, Brass & Percussion
Popular Music

There is also a School of Conducting within its Graduate School.

Student life

Students' Union
The RNCM students' union (RNCMSU) is the main student-run organisation. Besides representing the study body, the RNCMSU also plans and organises social programmes and provides peer support for students. The RNCMSU is member of the National Union of Students.

Student housing

There is a residential hall, Sir Charles Groves Hall, next to the campus. Alternatively, students may choose to rent a flat at the Manchester Student Homes, a provider of housing for university students in Manchester run by the Universities.

Notable alumni

Directors of the RNCM 
 John Manduell (1973–1996)
 :Edward Gregson (1996–2008)
 Jonty Stockdale (2008–2012)
 Linda Merrick (2013–present)

See also 
 Conservatoires UK
 Hallé Orchestra
 Bridgewater Hall
 Chetham's School of Music

References

Citations

Sources 

 Kennedy, Michael (1971) The History of the Royal Manchester College of Music. Manchester University Press
 Royal Manchester College of Music Archive: National Archives
 View of the college

External links 

 

 
Schools in Manchester
Educational institutions established in 1973
1973 establishments in England
Music in Manchester
Musical instrument museums